The 2020 Famous Idaho Potato Bowl was a college football bowl game played on January 3, 2020, with kickoff at 3:30 p.m. EST (1:30 p.m. local MST) on ESPN. It was the 23rd edition of the Famous Idaho Potato Bowl, and one of the 2019–20 bowl games concluding the 2019 FBS football season. The game was sponsored by the Idaho Potato Commission, from which it gets its name.

Teams
The game matched the Ohio Bobcats from the Mid-American Conference (MAC) and the Nevada Wolf Pack from the Mountain West Conference. This was the first meeting between the two programs.

Ohio Bobcats

Ohio entered the game with a 6–6 record (5–3 in conference). They finished in a three-way tie for second place in the MAC's East Division, and did not face any ranked FBS teams during the season. After starting the season 2–4, the Bobcats won four of their remaining six games to become bowl eligible. This was Ohio's second appearance in this bowl; their 2011 team won that season's Famous Idaho Potato Bowl over Utah State, 24–23.

Nevada Wolf Pack

Nevada entered the game with a 7–5 record (4–4 in conference). They finished in third place in Mountain West's West Division. The Wolf Pack were 1–1 against ranked FBS teams, defeating San Diego State while losing to Oregon. This was Nevada's third Famous Idaho Potato Bowl; the Wolf Pack were seeking their first victory in the bowl after losses in the 2006 MPC Computers Bowl (to Miami (FL)) and the 2008 Humanitarian Bowl (to Maryland), when the bowl operated under different names.

Game summary

Statistics

References

External links
 
 Game statistics at statbroadcast.com

Famous Idaho Potato Bowl
Famous Idaho Potato Bowl
Famous Idaho Potato Bowl
Famous Idaho Potato Bowl
Nevada Wolf Pack football bowl games
Ohio Bobcats football bowl games